Leona (minor planet designation: 319 Leona), provisional designation , is a dark asteroid and tumbling slow rotator from the outermost regions of the asteroid belt, approximately 70 kilometers in diameter. It was discovered on 8 October 1891, by French astronomer Auguste Charlois at Nice Observatory in southwestern France. Any reference of its name to a person is unknown. On 12 December 2023 Leona will occult Betelgeuse as seen from southern Europe.

Classification and orbit 

Leona orbits the Sun in the outer main-belt at a distance of 2.7–4.1 AU once every 6 years and 3 months (2,295 days). Its orbit has an eccentricity of 0.22 and an inclination of 11° with respect to the ecliptic.

The asteroid's observation arc begins at the discovering observatory, one night after its official discovery observation.

Physical characteristics

Spectral type 

Leona has been characterized as a dark and reddish P-type asteroid by the Wide-field Infrared Survey Explorer (WISE), and as an X-type asteroid by Pan-STARRS photometric survey. The Collaborative Asteroid Lightcurve Link groups it to the carbonaceous C-type asteroids.

Slow rotator and tumbler 

In October 2016, a rotational lightcurve of Leona was obtained from photometric observations by astronomers Frederick Pilcher (see naming cite for ) at Organ Mesa Observatory, United States, Lorenzo Franco at Balzaretto Observatory, Italy, and Petr Pravec at the Ondřejov Observatory, Czech Republic. Lightcurve analysis gave a well-defined rotation period of  hours with a brightness variation of 0.5 magnitude.

This makes Leona one of the Top 100 slowest rotators known to exist. The astronomers also detected a non-principal axis rotation seen in distinct rotational cycles in successive order. This tumbling also gives an alternative candidate period solution of  hours, one of the longest periods ever measured. It is the third-largest tumbler known to exists (also see List of tumblers).

Previous observations of Leona gave a much shorter period between 6 and 15 hours, which demonstrates the intricacy when observing slow rotators, especially those with a tumbling motion. A detailed description of the procedure of the photometric measurement is given by Pilcher.

Diameter and albedo 

According to the surveys carried out by the Japanese Akari satellite and the NEOWISE mission of NASA's WISE space-telescope, Leona measures between 49.943 and 89.00 kilometers in diameter and its surface has an albedo between 0.02 and 0.085. CALL derived an albedo of 0.0318 and a diameter of 67.97 kilometers based on an absolute magnitude of 10.2.

Naming 

The origin of this minor planet's name is unknown.

Among the many thousands of named minor planets, Leona is one of 120 asteroids for which no official naming citation has been published.

2023 occultation of Betelgeuse 

On 12 December 2023 Leona will occult Betelgeuse as seen from southern Europe.

References

External links 
 Asteroid Lightcurve Database (LCDB), query form (info )
 Dictionary of Minor Planet Names, Google books
 Asteroids and comets rotation curves, CdR – Observatoire de Genève, Raoul Behrend
 Discovery Circumstances: Numbered Minor Planets (1)-(5000) – Minor Planet Center
 
 

000319
Discoveries by Auguste Charlois
Named minor planets
000319
18911008